Wesley "Moose" Theodore Englehorn (January 21, 1890 – September 3, 1993) was an American college football player and coach.

Career
Englehorn was born on January 21, 1890, to Herman and Emma Lenz, Englehorn attended Spokane High School, where he played basketball, football, and track and field. While a junior, he was reportedly recruited by Princeton University to play football. Englehorn declined Princeton and instead played for two years for the All-Star Pacific Northwest basketball and football teams.

Englehorn chose to attend Washington State College, where he played football for the Cougars. After one year there, he transferred to Dartmouth College, where he played tackle for two years for the Big Green. In 1912, Englehorn was selected as a consensus pick for the College Football All-America Team.

Englehorn was elected team captain for the 1913 season, but was declared ineligible due to a "three-year rule". Instead, he and Jogger Elcock served as a team assistants, under coach Frank Cavanaugh, in 1913. Englehorn ultimately graduated from Dartmouth in 1914.

In 1914, Englehorn was hired as the head coach at the Case School of Applied Science in Cleveland. During his tenure at Case, in 1915, he married Viola S. Snead (1892-1978), with whom he had two children: Mary Louise (1917-1987) and Jane (1921-2001).

In 1917, Englehorn was hired as an assistant and line coach for Colgate University, under coach Harold McDevitt. Three years later, Englehorn reunited with coach Cavanaugh, instead as an assistant for Boston College.

In 1921, Englehorn was hired as the head coach at Amherst College. Just a year later, he announced his retirement from coaching, and was replaced by Tuss McLaughry.

Prior to his death on September 3, 1993, at the age of 103, Englehorn was living at Stapeley Hall, a retirement community in Germantown, and at the time, was the oldest living All-American college football player. He was buried at Chapel of the Chimes in Oakland.

Head coaching record

See also
List of centenarians (sportspeople)

References

External links
 

1890 births
1993 deaths
American centenarians
Men centenarians
American football tackles
Amherst Mammoths football coaches
Boston College Eagles football coaches
Case Western Spartans football coaches
Colgate Raiders football coaches
Dartmouth Big Green football coaches
Dartmouth Big Green football players
Washington State Cougars football players
Sportspeople from Helena, Montana
Coaches of American football from Washington (state)
Players of American football from Spokane, Washington